It's About Time is the 17th studio album by American singer-songwriter John Denver recorded at Criteria Recording Studios in Miami and released in November 1983. The album featured several notable supporting vocalists, including Patti Austin, Rita Marley (and The Wailers), and Emmylou Harris. "Wild Montana Skies" was the single from this album; members of the Western Writers of America chose it as one of the Top 100 Western songs of all time.

It contains the following dedication from John Denver: "This album is dedicated with great love and respect to the memory of my father, Lt. Col. (Ret.) H.J. "Dutch" Deutschendorf."

Track listing
All tracks composed by John Denver; except where indicated

Side One
"Hold on Tightly" – 4:00
"Thought of You" – 4:02
"Somethin' About" – 3:44
"On the Wings of a Dream" – 5:01
"Flight (The Higher We Fly)" (Adapted from the Poem by John Gillespie Magee, Jr.; Words: John Gillespie Magee, Jr., John Denver and Joe Henry; Music: Lee Holdridge) – 3:16

Side Two
"Falling Out of Love" – 4:56
"I Remember Romance" – 5:25
"Wild Montana Skies" – 4:02
"The Way I Am"1
"World Game" – 4:58
"It's About Time" (Denver, Glen D. Hardin) – 3:42

1Not featured on cassette version or on original LP.

Personnel
The following information is from the CD insert.

Musicians
All personnel in this section are credited along with John Denver as arrangers.
Jerry Carrigan – drums and percussion
Jerry Scheff – bass
Glen Hardin – piano, Rhodes, B-3
James Burton – lead guitars (electric and acoustic)
Jim Horn – saxophone, flute, recorder

Additional musicians
Larry Fast – synthesizer
Fred Wickstrom – marimbas

Muscle Shoals Horns
Harvey Thompson – tenor saxophone
Charles Rose – trombone
Harrison Calloway, Jr. – trumpet
with Jim Horn – baritone saxophone

Background vocals
Patti Austin
Ullanda McCullough
Conrad Reeder
Emmylou Harris on "Wild Montana Skies"

Musicians from "World Game"
The Wailers
Aston "Family Man" Barrett – bass
Carlton "Carli" Barrett – drums
Steve Stewart – piano
Earl "Wire" Lindo – organ
Alvin Patterson – percussion
Lloyd "Gits" Willis – guitar
The I Threes
Rita Marley
Marcia Griffiths

Arrangers
Lee Holdridge – strings
Patti Austin – background vocals

Engineers
Roger Nichols – Recording And Mixing Engineer
John Slywka – Assistant Engineer
Patrice Carroll-Levinsohn – Assistant Engineer

Chart performance

References

John Denver albums
1983 albums
Albums arranged by Lee Holdridge
RCA Records albums